Hybrids (also titled The Hybrids Family) is a 2015 American horror comedy family film directed by Tony Randel and starring Paul Sorvino and Carolyn Hennesy.

Plot
The story of a dysfunctional family of vampires and witches and the two children who are hybrids.

Cast
Paul Sorvino as The Count
Carolyn Hennesy as Aradia
Mojean Aria as Blaz
Philip Willingham as Todor
Anne Leighton as Valantina
Leanne Agmon as Velana
Chris De Christopher as Tug
Charles Noland as Prater
Chuck Ardezzone as Vinni
Lauren Lakis as Maria
Jean St. James as Alice
Lee Knorr as Nancy
Erika Enggren as Alicia
Rawle D. Lewis as Mr. Trellis
Tatanka Means as Lance Hatton

Production
Principal photography took place in Ave Maria, Florida for thirty days during the summer of 2014.

According to Chuck Ardezzone, the film created more than 50 jobs and worked with 34 local businesses during the movie shooting.

According to Tony Schweikle, "Burt Reynolds was on tap to play the father vampire, but then right before we finished the contract, he got very sick and couldn’t do it.  Tony Randel knew one of Paul Sorvino’s daughters, and we offered Paul a script. Unbeknownst to us, he accepted and did the film for minimal money because he always wanted to play Bela Lugosi! We never knew that, but he’s talked about that in several interviews. It was serendipity."

Awards
The film won the Best Feature Comedy Film Award at the 20th annual International Family Film Festival (IFFF) in Santa Clarita, California.

References

External links
 
 
 

American comedy horror films
Films directed by Tony Randel
2015 films
Vampire comedy films
Films shot in Florida
Films about dysfunctional families
Films about witchcraft
2010s English-language films
2010s American films